Lepidosperma urophorum, the rapier saw sedge  is a forest dwelling plant found in south eastern Australia. Often found on sandy soils near streams. It may grow to 1.5 metres high.

The specific epithet urophorum is derived from the Greek meaning "tail-bearing". Which refers to the slender inflorescence. It is distinguished from Lepidosperma flexuosum by the flower panicle branchlets being straight, rather than crooked.

References

urophorum
Flora of New South Wales
Flora of Victoria (Australia)
Poales of Australia
Plants described in 1954